Béla von Kehrling (25 January 1891 – 26 April 1937) was a Hungarian tennis, table tennis, and football player but eventually a winter sportsman familiar with ice-hockey and occasionally competing in bobsleigh. He competed at the 1912 Summer Olympics and the 1924 Summer Olympics.

Just like Fred Perry, he played both tennis and table tennis professionally. In 1926 he played in the first table tennis World Championships final in London with Zoltán Mechlovits in doubles but lost to Roland Jacobi (who won the singles title) and Dániel Pécsi. He was also featured in the Hungarian team that won gold in team competition. Originally he wasn't part of the national team. While the Hungarians unanimously swept all of the medals after Roland Jacobi's singles and doubles success he suddenly been reported of the death of his father thus he decided to travel home. The substitute player was Béla von Kehrling who had to beat Munio Pillinger of Austria to have the team medal as well. He did so and completed the flawless victory for Hungary. In the end he took two medals in the table tennis world championships, one gold and one silver.

In 1924 he won the German Tennis Championships. The following year he was back in the finals but then lost against Otto Froitzheim. The same year he won Hungarian Tennis Championships (which he did 13 times altogether counting only the singles). In July 1933 Von Kehrling won the doubles and mixed doubles title at the Dutch Championships.

Züricher Sport newspaper ranked Kehrling as No. 10 in the European Top 10 rankings in 1931.

In conjunction with his sports activity he was the vice-president of the Hungarian Tennis Association and the editor-in-chief of its official magazine the bimonthly Tennisz és Golf (Tennis and Golf).

Personal life
Béla Kehrling married Magda Schlauch. She occasionally played tennis as well and wrote articles to the newspaper published by her husband. They had one son named Béla Kehrling, Jr, born in 1917 in Budapest who served as an Ensign in the cavalry brigade of the Hungarian Army in 1944. They had another son named Tamás who was born in 1924 and died in 1999.

Tennis career  statistics

Notable singles wins

Runner-up

 The All England Plate was a tournament played by the losers of the first two rounds of the Wimbledon Men's Singles tournament.
 The Göteborg Games were A "mini-Olympics" held for the defeated nations of World War I who were defected from the 1924 Summer Olympics.

Davis Cup

Table tennis career statistics
World Table Tennis Championships
 1926 London
 2nd place doubles (with Zoltán Mechlovits)
 1st place with the Hungarian team (Dániel Pécsi, Zoltán Mechlovits, Roland Jacobi)
 International Masters Cup
 1927 Berlin  – 1st place doubles (with Zoltán Mechlovits)

Football career statistics

Ice hockey career statistics

Sources
 Béla von Kehrling i ITTF-Databank
 Svenska Bordtennisförbundets webbplats

References

See also
Hungary Davis Cup team
Hungary men's national ice hockey team
Hungary national football team

External links
 Ittf.com
 
 

1891 births
1937 deaths
Sportspeople from Poprad
Hungarian male table tennis players
Hungarian male tennis players
Hungarian ice hockey players
Hungarian footballers
Association football defenders
Hungarian male bobsledders
Hungarian journalists
Austro-Hungarian military personnel of World War I
Olympic tennis players of Hungary
Tennis players at the 1912 Summer Olympics
Tennis players at the 1924 Summer Olympics
World Table Tennis Championships medalists
Hungary international footballers
20th-century journalists
Burials at Farkasréti Cemetery